Argonaute (S 636) is an , and the fourth ship of the French Navy to bear the name. Launched on 29 June 1957, the submarine served as flagship within the Toulon submarine squadron. Argonaute was decommissioned on 31 July 1982. The vessel was converted to a museum ship in 1989 and located in Paris.

Description
Designated "hunter submarines" by the French Navy the Aréthuse class were designed as attack submarines specifically for operations in the Mediterranean Sea. The design retained a small silhouette and great manoeverability. The Aréthuse class were the first French submarines to use a diesel-electric propulsion system and were powered by two 12-cylinder SEMT Pielstick diesel engines driving one shaft rated at  surfaced. The generators were placed on spring suspensions and the motor was attached directly to the shaft creating a near-silent operational environment while submerged. Argonaute had a maximum speed of  surfaced and  submerged.

Argonaute was armed with four torpedo tubes in the bow for four  torpedoes. The submarine carried four reloads. The class was designed primarily for anti-submarine warfare. Argonaute was initially equipped with DUUA I sonar. The Aréthuse-class submarines had a complement of 40 including 6 officers. By 1981, Argonautes sonar had been upgraded to one active DUUA II sonar, one passive DUUA II sonar, one passive ranging DUUX 2 sonar.

Service history
Argonaute, were ordered as part of the 1953 construction programme. The submarine was constructed at the Arsenal de Cherbourg in Cherbourg, France and was laid down in March 1955. The submarine was launched on 29 June 1957 and commissioned on 11 February 1959. Argonaute operated exclusively in the Mediterranean Sea as a deterrent against threats to commercial shipping between France and its colonies in North Africa. Argonaute was taken out of service and placed in reserve in 1982.

Museum ship
In 1982, the Association of Friends of the Maritime Museum for the Atlantic selected Argonaute to save from scrapping. The Minister of Defence, Charles Hernu, agreed to save the submarine in 1984 after it was to become part of a permanent exhibition devoted to history of submarines and the technologies used in their construction at Cité des sciences et de l'industrie in La Villette Park, Paris.

Argonaute, in reserve since 1982, was transported in 1989 on a  barge, itself pulled by a tug, which arrived in Le Havre three weeks later via Gibraltar. The barge then went up the Seine to Gennevilliers where a dozen float balloons were added to raise the draught of the barge. Then the barge passed through the seven locks of the Saint-Denis Canal. Once at the quay on the Canal de l'Ourcq, Argonaute was lifted from the water by cranes and transported  by trailer to its current site. Argonaute opened to the public in 1991, outside the Cité des sciences et de l'industrie, 30 Avenue Corentin Cariou, in the 19th arrondissement of Paris. In 2018, the permanent exhibition underwent an overhaul to include information about the future of the oceans.

See also 
 List of submarines of France
 List of museums in Paris

Citations

References

External links

 Photographies 
 NetMarine.net 
 Places in France entry
 Argonaute Submarine EUtouring Entry

Aréthuse-class submarines
Ships built in France
1957 ships
Cold War submarines of France
Museum ships in France
Museums in Paris
Buildings and structures in the 19th arrondissement of Paris